The 1922 Creighton Blue and White football team was an American football team that represented Creighton University as member of the North Central Conference (NCC) during the 1922 college football season. In its second season under head coach Howard M. Baldrige, the team compiled a 7–2–1 record and outscored opponents by a total of 111 to 80. The team played its home games in Omaha, Nebraska.

Schedule

References

Creighton
Creighton Bluejays football seasons
Creighton Blue and White football